Dolmatovo is a rural locality (a village) in Slednevskoye Rural Settlement, Alexandrovsky District, Vladimir Oblast, Russia. The population was 22 as of 2010. There are 3 streets.

Geography 
Dolmatovo is located 12 km northwest of Alexandrov (the district's administrative centre) by road. Kalinino is the nearest rural locality.

References 

Rural localities in Alexandrovsky District, Vladimir Oblast